Argyll and Bute (Gaelic: Earra-Ghàidheal agus Bòd) is a constituency of the Scottish Parliament (Holyrood) covering most of the council area of Argyll and Bute. It elects one Member of the Scottish Parliament (MSP) by the first past the post method of election. It is also one of eight constituencies in the Highlands and Islands electoral region, which elects seven additional members, in addition to the eight constituency MSPs, to produce a form of proportional representation for the region as a whole.

The seat has been held by Jenni Minto of the Scottish National Party since the 2021 Scottish Parliament election.

Electoral region 

The Argyll and Bute constituency is part of the Highlands and Islands electoral region; the other seven constituencies are Caithness, Sutherland and Ross, Inverness and Nairn, Moray, Na h-Eileanan an Iar, Orkney, Shetland and Skye, Lochaber and Badenoch.

The region covers most of Argyll and Bute council area, all of the Highland council area, most of the Moray council area, all of the Orkney Islands council area, all of the Shetland Islands council area and all of Na h-Eileanan Siar.

Constituency boundaries and council area 
The Argyll and Bute constituency was created at the same time as the Scottish Parliament, in 1999, with the name and boundaries of an  existing Westminster constituency. In 2005, however, the Westminster (House of Commons) constituency was enlarged slightly.

The Holyrood constituency covers most of the Argyll and Bute council area. The rest of the council area (which includes the town of Helensburgh) is covered by the Dumbarton constituency in the West Scotland electoral region. The Argyll and Bute Westminster constituency has covered the whole of the council area since 2005.

From the 2011 Scottish Parliament election, boundary changes altered the existing Argyll and Bute constituency. All but three electoral wards of the Argyll and Bute council area were used in the creation of the new seat, namely:

Cowal, Dunoon, Isle of Bute, Kintyre and the Islands, Mid Argyll, Oban North and Lorn, Oban South and the Isles, South Kintyre.

As of 2019, Argyll and Bute's population (60,394) was the lowest among the 70 Holyrood mainland constituencies, barely two-thirds of the total of those at the top of the list, headed by Linlithgow which had over 95,000 within its boundaries.

Member of the Scottish Parliament

Election results

2020s

2010s

2000s

1990s

Notes

External links

Constituencies of the Scottish Parliament
Politics of Argyll and Bute
1999 establishments in Scotland
Constituencies established in 1999
Scottish Parliament constituencies and regions 1999–2011
Scottish Parliament constituencies and regions from 2011
Dunoon
Oban
Lochgilphead
Campbeltown
Isle of Bute
Islay
Jura, Scotland
Inveraray